WIXN (1460 AM) is a radio station licensed to Dixon, Illinois, covering Northern Illinois, including Dixon, Sterling, and Rock Falls. WIXN currently has an oldies format and is owned by NRG Media. The station is also rebroadcast on translator station W236DM 95.1 FM in Dixon.

See also
 WRCV
 WSEY

References

External links
WIXN's website

Oldies radio stations in the United States
IXN
NRG Media radio stations